Francis Pierre Horton Perrin (born 10 October 1947) is a French actor, screenwriter and director.

Career
He enter the Comédie-Française in 1972, but left the following year.

He headed the Théâtre Montansier in his birthplace from 1992 to 2000.

In 2001, he was made Officier de l'ordre national du Mérite, in 2007 Officier de la Légion d'honneur and in 2016, Officier des Arts et Lettres.

Theater

Filmography

Actor

Filmmaker

References

External links

 
 Francis Perrin on AlloCiné

Living people
1947 births
French film directors
French male screenwriters
French screenwriters
People from Versailles
Officiers of the Légion d'honneur
Troupe of the Comédie-Française
French male stage actors
French male film actors
French male television actors
20th-century French male actors
21st-century French male actors
Officers of the Order of Cultural Merit (Monaco)